The statue of James Outram, a work by Matthew Noble, stands in Whitehall Gardens in London, south of Hungerford Bridge. It is a Grade II listed structure.

Unusually, the plan to erect the statue began in Outram's own lifetime, at a public meeting held in Willis's Rooms, London, on 5 March 1861. The general had recently returned to Britain from India, the stage on which his military career had been played out, due to poor health. It was decided to erect an equestrian monument in Calcutta, with J. H. Foley as the sculptor, and a standing design by Matthew Noble in London, "near [the statue] of his illustrious comrade, Sir Henry Havelock", on Trafalgar Square. Permission for this site was refused by the First Commissioner of Works, who subsequently offered a site in the yet-to-be-created Embankment Gardens. The statue was unveiled by Lord Halifax, a former Secretary of State for India, on 17 August 1871.

The bronze statue rests on a granite pedestal.

References

External links
 
 Statue of Sir James Outram, Westminster at British Listed Buildings
 General Sir James Outram statue, Victoria Embankment Gardens, Westminster, London at Europeana
 Statue: General Sir James Outram at London Remembers
 Sir James Outram – Whitehall Gardens, London, UK at Waymarking

1871 establishments in England
1871 in London
1871 sculptures
Bronze sculptures in the United Kingdom
Outram, James
Outdoor sculptures in London
Outram, James
Statues in London
Victoria Embankment